Sohara Station is the name of two train stations in Japan:

 Sohara Station (Gifu) (蘇原駅)
 Sohara Station (Mie) (楚原駅)